The United States Penitentiary, Lee (USP Lee) is a high-security United States federal prison for male inmates in Virginia. It is operated by the Federal Bureau of Prisons, a division of the United States Department of Justice. The facility also has an adjacent satellite prison camp which houses minimum-security male offenders.

USP Lee is located in the Lee County Industrial Park an unincorporated area in Lee County, Virginia, in the southwest part of the state.

History
The annual per capita income of Lee County was $12,917 in the early 1990s, making the Virginia area a prime candidate to host a federal prison and bring money into the community.

Architectural and construction work of the  facility was administered by Hayes, Seay, Mattern & Mattern, now known as AECOM. Computer modeling was utilized to identify and minimize blindspots of prison watchtowers. Construction began in the summer of 1998 on a budget of $102 million. The penitentiary was completed in August 2001 and began receiving inmates in 2002. According to project manager Gary Carsten of the Federal Bureau of Prisons, the main recurring problem of the facility is the excessive strain on Lee County's sewage system.

Archaeological discoveries on the prison property include arrowheads and pottery from a Native American gravesite believed to be associated with an ancient hospital dating as far back as 10,000 years.

Notable incidents
On February 25, 2008, inmate Edward Porta was noted to be missing during a 4 p.m. count after apparently walking away from the minimum security camp. Porta defrauded the U.S. Department of Agriculture of more than $400,000.  He remained a fugitive for over eight years until he was recaptured in May 2016, and was profiled on the television program America's Most Wanted.

There have been incidents of violence at USP Lee and several homicides. Inmate Quinten Corniel was killed on September 30, 2008, and inmate Ernest Bennett died on January 22, 2010, both during altercations with other inmates. On April 29, 2010, Filikisi Hafoka, a member of the Tongan Crip Gang, was taken off life support after being stabbed on the previous weekend. As is procedure, USP Lee went into lockdown after these incidents and investigations were conducted. The killers of Corniel and Bennett were subsequently convicted of murder and sentenced to life in prison.

Notable inmates (current and former)

Organized crime

Other crimes

See also

 List of U.S. federal prisons
 Federal Bureau of Prisons
 Incarceration in the United States

References

External links
 USP Lee at the Federal Bureau of Prisons (Official site)

2002 establishments in Virginia
Archaeological sites in Virginia
Prisons in Virginia
Buildings and structures in Lee County, Virginia
United States Penitentiaries